700 Market is a six-story office building located at 700 Market Street in downtown St. Louis, Missouri, United States.  Spire, Inc. is the sole tenant of the building, using it for its corporate headquarters.

The building was previously the General American Life Insurance Company National Headquarters, located on 706 Market St., and is on the National Register of Historic Places. It is LEED Gold Certified by the U.S. Green Building Council.

History 
Originally known as the GenAm Building, 700 Market was designed in the 1970s by architect Philip Johnson, as headquarters for the General American Life Insurance Company (later absorbed into MetLife).

GenAm relocated in 2004 and the building remained vacant until redevelopment began in April 2014.

The building was purchased by Centaur Properties of New York in 2005 for $6.5 million.  Centaur claimed to have a $10 million renovation plan in place in 2010 to help attract potential tenants, however the investment never occurred.  The Koman Group bought the building in January 2014 from Centaur for $11.5 million and began a full redevelopment of the building three months later.  Upon completion of the redevelopment in 2015, the building was renamed 700 Market and Spire, Inc moved into the building on a 20-year lease.

References 

Commercial buildings in Missouri
Office buildings in St. Louis
Downtown St. Louis
National Register of Historic Places in St. Louis
Buildings and structures in St. Louis
2008 establishments in Missouri